Betzy Aleksandra Kjelsberg (née Børresen) (1 November 1866 – 3 October 1950) was a Norwegian women's rights activist, suffragist and a member of the feminist movement. She was a politician with the Liberal Party and  the first female board member of the party.

Biography
Betzy Aleksandra Børresen was born at Svelvik in Vestfold, Norway. She was the daughter of Thor Børresen (1816–72) and Jessie McGlashan (1842–1915). Her father was Norwegian, while her mother was from Scotland. After her father died, the family moved to Drammen, where Betzy's mother married merchant Anton Enger. However, he had to close his shop, forcing them to move to Christiania (now Oslo). While living there, she started her examen artium, as one of the first women in Norway to do so, but she never actually finished it due to the poor economy of her stepfather. 

In 1883, she co-founded the discussion group Skuld together with Cecilie Thoresen Krog. Kjelsberg created the associations Women's Trade Organization  (Kvinnelig Handelsstands forening) in 1894, Drammen Women's Association (Drammen Kvinnesaksforening) in 1896, with its own housewife school, Drammen Public Health (1899)  and Drammen Women's Council (1903). She was a co-founder of the Norwegian Association for Women's Rights (1884) and the National Association for Women's Suffrage (1885), which worked for giving women the right to vote.

The Norwegian National Women's Council (Norske Kvinners Nasjonalråd) was founded in 1904 as an umbrella organization for the various Norwegian women's associations. She served as a member of the organization together with fellow  rights activists Karen Grude Koht, Fredrikke Marie Qvam, Gina Krog and Katti Anker Møller. From 1916 she served as Presidents of the Women's Council.

In 1905, Kjelsberg was elected to the city council  of Drammen, where she sat for two terms. In 1910 she became Norway's first female factory inspector - a position she had until 1936. From 1921–1934, Kjelsberg was the Norwegian government's representative at the meetings of the International Labour Organization  in Geneva. From 1926–1938, she was the vice-president of the International Council of Women.

Honors
In 1916, she was awarded the King's Medal of Merit (Kongens fortjenstmedalje) in gold.
In 1935, she was appointed Knight 1st Class in the Order of St. Olav.

Personal life
In 1885, she was married to jurist Oluf Fredrik Kjelsberg (1861–1923), with whom she had six children. They were the great-grandparents of Siv Jensen, leader of the Norwegian Progress Party.

Legacy
Betzy Kjelsberg died during 1950 in Bergen. She was buried at Vår Frelsers gravlund in Oslo. Betzy Kjelsbergs vei in Oslo, Betzy Kjelsbergs vei in Drammen and Betzy Kjelsbergs gate in Stavanger are all street in Norway named in her honor.
There is a statue of her on Marcus Thranes gate (ring 2) in Oslo.

References

Other sources
 
Reistad, Gunhild Ramm (1994) Betzy Kjelsberg og Drammen  (Brakar AS lokalhistorisk forlag) 
 Folkvord, Magnhild (2016) Betzy Kjelsberg – Feminist og brubyggjar (Oslo: Samlaget)

Further reading
Agerholt, Anna Caspari (1973) Den norske kvinnebevegelses historie (Oslo: Gyldendal)

Bibliography
 

1866 births
1950 deaths
People from Svelvik
People from Drammen
Norwegian feminists
Norwegian suffragists
Factory inspectors
Norwegian women's rights activists
Liberal Party (Norway) politicians
20th-century Norwegian women politicians
20th-century Norwegian politicians
Recipients of the King's Medal of Merit in gold
Recipients of the St. Olav's Medal
Burials at the Cemetery of Our Saviour
Norwegian Association for Women's Rights people